The boys' mass start speed skating competition of the 2020 Winter Youth Olympics was held at Lake St. Moritz on 16 January 2020.

Results

Semifinals 
The first semifinal was held at 11:30, the second at 11:40.

Semifinal 1

Semifinal 2

Final 
The final was held at 12:40.

References 

 

Boys' mass start